CYBC may refer to:

 Cyprus Broadcasting Corporation, Cyprus' public broadcasting service.
 The IATA code for Baie-Comeau Airport, in Baie-Comeau, Quebec, Canada.